James McIlvaine Riley (May 16, 1849 - May 6, 1911) is one of the founders of the Sigma Nu fraternity. Born in St. Louis, Missouri, he entered the Virginia Military Institute (VMI) in the fall of 1866.  Riley was a member of VMI's first baseball team in the fall of 1866, playing second base and eventually serving as the team's captain. While at VMI, James Frank Hopkins, Greenfield Quarles and Riley became close friends and founded Sigma Nu fraternity.  Riley was elected the first Commander (or President) of the chapter at VMI, and served as the first Regent of Sigma Nu fraternity, a position he held for ten years. He died at age 61 and is buried in a plot in Bellefontaine Cemetery near the St. Louis Alumni chapter.

External links

References 

1849 births
1911 deaths
Virginia Military Institute alumni
People from St. Louis
Burials at Bellefontaine Cemetery
Sigma Nu founders